Mordellistena sericata is a species of beetle in the genus Mordellistena of the family Mordellidae. It was described by Thomas Vernon Wollaston in 1864.

References

External links
Coleoptera. BugGuide.

Beetles described in 1864
sericata